The Rösterkopf in the Osburger Hochwald (Hunsrück in Rhineland-Palatinate, Germany) is a mountain with a height of 708 m.

Mountains and hills of Rhineland-Palatinate
Mountains and hills of the Hunsrück